Oxalis micrantha, or dwarf woodsorrel, is a flowering dicot of the genus Oxalis.

References

micrantha